RC Krems is an Austrian rugby club in Krems an der Donau. They currently focus most of their efforts on sevens and tens, but also play friendly matches.

History
From 2007 up to 2010, they teamed up with Wombats RC and played as the Niederösterreich XV.

External links

Austrian rugby union teams